Beauty and the Bad Man is a 1925 American silent Western film directed by William Worthington and starring Mabel Ballin, Forrest Stanley, and Russell Simpson.

Plot
As described in a film magazine review, Cassie, an orphan with vocal abilities, enters the mining town after fleeing from her worthless husband of one day. She meets the gambler, who likes her and stakes her with the money he won after breaking the bank. She uses the money to cultivate her voice, and then returns to the mining town famous. Her old husband wants her to return, and when she refuses he fires a gun, but he is late and is winged by a friend of the gambler. Cassie then realizes her love for the gambler.

Cast

Preservation
With no prints of Beauty and the Bad Man located in any film archives, it is a lost film.

References

External links

 
 
 Lantern slide at silenthollywood.com

1925 Western (genre) films
Films directed by William Worthington
American black-and-white films
Producers Distributing Corporation films
Silent American Western (genre) films
1920s English-language films
1920s American films
Films with screenplays by Richard Schayer
Films about orphans